The Labor Left, also known as the Progressive Left or Socialist Left, is political faction of the Australian Labor Party (ALP). It competes with the more economically liberal Labor Right faction.

The Labor Left operates autonomously in each state and territory of Australia, and organises as a broad alliance at the national level. Its policy positions include party democratisation, economic interventionism, progressive tax reform, refugee rights, gender equality and same-sex marriage. The faction includes members with a range of political perspectives, including Keynesianism, trade union militancy, Fabian social democracy, New Leftism, and democratic socialism.

Factional activity 

Most political parties contain informal factions of members who work towards common goals, however the Australian Labor Party is noted for having highly structured and organised factions across the ideological spectrum.

Labor Left is a membership-based organisation which has internal office bearers, publications, and policy positions. The faction coordinates political activity and policy development across different hierarchical levels and organisational components of the party, negotiates with other factions on political strategy and policy, and uses party processes to try to defeat other groups if consensus cannot be reached.

Many members of parliament and trade union leaders are formally aligned with the Left and Right factions, and party positions and ministerial allocations are negotiated and divided between the factions based on the proportion of Labor caucus aligned with that faction.

History

Labor left factions before the 1950s 
Historian Frank Bongiorno has noted that there had been a number of organisations associated with the left wing of Labor before the 1950s, from the Australian Socialist League in the 1890s, the industrial left which emerged during World War I, the early supporters of Jack Lang, and the State Labor Party of the 1940s.

Labor Party split of 1955 
The modern Labor Left emerged from the Labor Party split of 1955, in which anti-Communist activists associated with B. A. Santamaria and the Industrial Groups formed the Democratic Labor Party while left-wing parliamentarians and unions loyal to H. V. Evatt and Arthur Calwell remained in the Australian Labor Party. The earliest formal factional organization was the NSW Combined Unions and Branches Steering Committee (later known as the NSW Socialist Left), which was formed in January 1955.

The split played out differently across the country, with anti-Communists leaving the party in Victoria and Queensland but remaining within in most other states. This created a power vacuum which allowed the Left to take control of the Federal Executive and Victorian state branch, while its opponents were preserved elsewhere. Tom Uren described the left of the Labor Party Caucus upon his election to Parliament in the late 1950s as "a loosely knit grouping... consist(ing) mostly of anti-Catholics, although some members were militants or socialists".

From 1965 organised internal groups emerged to challenge the control of the Left, supported by figures such as John Button and Gough Whitlam. After the Victorian branch lost the 1970 state election in the midst of a public dispute with Whitlam over state aid for private schools, the South Australian Left, led by Clyde Cameron, and New South Wales Left, led by Arthur Gietzelt, agreed to support an intervention which saw the Victorian state branch abolished and subsequently reconstructed without Left control. Leftists in the Victorian party subsequently regrouped as the formally organized Socialist Left faction. In Queensland, the left coalesced around senator George Georges. Despite an increasing level of organisation in the grassroots party, this was not reflected within the Parliamentary caucus: Ken Fry noted that when he was elected to Parliament in 1974, meetings of left MPs were irregular and they responded to events in an ad hoc manner. The Labor Left suffered the loss of two of its key leaders in the mid-1970s with the downfall of Jim Cairns and the elevation of Lionel Murphy to the High Court of Australia, yet it continued to make advances in terms of nationwide organisation: right-wing power broker Graham Richardson has acknowledged that "at the beginning of the 1980s the Left was the only national faction".

Labor Left split in the 1980s
Labor leftists continued to formalise their organisation into the 1980s. In New South Wales, the Steering Committee (which later became known as the Socialist Left in 1989) made advances in branches across the state in the late 1970s and early 1980s under the leadership of Peter Baldwin, initially in the suburbs of Sydney before spreading to the inner cities. This culminated in the deselection of the right-aligned MP for Sydney, Les McMahon, and the selection of Baldwin as Labor candidate for the seat. This was followed by other Labor Right MPs in Sydney's Inner West similarly being usurped by left candidates.

In Tasmania, the Broad Left formalised itself in 1983, having taken control of the state party after reforms democratised it in 1976. In the Australian Capital Territory, the Left Caucus was founded after a left candidate was not preselected in 1982. However, the Left were unable to translate their organisational advances into a presence in the Hawke Government: although about a third of the Parliamentary caucus were aligned with the Left at the time, only one member was appointed to Hawke's first cabinet, Stewart West: leading left-winger Brian Howe placed high in the ministry ballot, but was relegated to a junior ministerial position. This came against the background of an increasing factionalising across the party and the emergence of a centre-left faction which joined with the Labor Right to dominate the Hawke government. Left influence was also restricted by the ALP's binding pledge committing legislators to accept caucus discipline, allowing members little freedom to dissent. Left influence also declined at the national conference, with the faction losing its conference majority in the early 1980s.

During the 1980s, prolonged disputes over tactical issues and personality conflicts resulted in a split occurring within the New South Wales Labor Left, creating two sub-factional groupings; the 'Hard Left' and the 'Soft Left', the latter of which was the successor of the Baldwinites. A significant event which caused the split was the election of the Secretary Assistant of the New South Wales Labor Party, where the Hard Left faction supported Anthony Albanese while the Soft Left faction supported Jan Burnswoods. The Hard Left faction was more closely aligned with left-wing groups external to the Labor Party, maintaining "closer links with broader left-wing groups, such as the Communist Party of Australia, People for Nuclear Disarmament and the African National Congress" as well as trade union officials, political staffers, lobbyists and student politicians, while the Soft Left's main base of support was among rank-and-file party branch members. In terms of tactics, the Hard Left favoured a top-down approach of transactional negotiation with the Labor Right, whilst the Soft Left advocated a continuation of the Baldwinite bottom-up strategy of mobilising the grassroots membership to win party positions. This difference in approach led to struggles between the two factions over candidate selections, with the Hard Left using their control over the party apparatus in tandem with sections of the Right to deselect Soft Left MPs across the state, particularly in western Sydney, Newcastle and Wollongong. For example, in Newcastle Bryce Gaudry was deselected in favour of the Right's Jodi McKay, following which about 130 members resigned or were expelled from the city's ALP branches, previously the largest in the state. The factions also had differing views on policy. While members of both the Soft and Hard Left opposed the Hawke/Keating government's privatisation of the Commonwealth Bank and Qantas, the Hard Left was seen as being more staunchly resistant to these changes.

Lindsay Tanner, writing in the early 1990s, argued that the principal "axis of division" with the ALP cut across the traditional left-right divide, namely the opposition of "rationalists" and "traditionalists", with the former supporting the Prices and Incomes Accord and union mergers, and abandoning or watering down their commitment to traditional Labor objectives such as public ownership, non-interventionism in foreign policy, and maintenance of working-class living standards, whilst the latter were negative towards the Accord, opposed to union mergers, sympathetic toward economic autarky, and attached to traditional Labor policy objectives. This divide can be seen through the career of Joan Kirner, who served as Premier of Victoria between 1990 and 1992 and was the first member of the modern Labor Left to lead a government, who supported the ascent of Paul Keating to the post of Prime Minister and his decision to privatise Commonwealth Bank to finance a bailout for the ailing State Bank of Victoria. This resulted in the formation of a splinter group from the Socialist Left, the Pledge faction, which opposed privatisation: in 1996, Pledge allied with another left split, the Labour Renewal Alliance, and the right wing Labor Unity faction to take control of the party away from the Socialist Left.

Labor Left factions from all jurisdictions

Federal members of the Labor Left

See also 
 :Category:Labor Left politicians, current and former parliamentary members of the Labor Left
 Labor Right

References

Further reading 
 Barcan, Alan, (1960) The socialist left in Australia 1949–1959 Sydney: Australian Political Studies Association (Occasional monograph (Australian Political Studies Association)) no. 2.
 Leigh, Andrew, (2000) Factions and Fractions: A Case Study of Power Politics in the Australian Labor Party Australian Journal of Political Science, 2000, volume 35, issue 3, pages 427–448.
 Bongiorno, Frank (2014) The New South Wales Left at 60 NSW Left Website.

External links 
 NSW Left website
 Young Labor Left NSW website
 SA Socialist Left website
 QLD Left website
 Challenge Magazine website

Australian labour movement
Australian Labor Party factions
Democratic socialism
Left-wing politics in Australia
Progressivism